Phryneta coeca is a species of beetle in the family Cerambycidae. It was described by Chevrolat in 1857. It is known from Tanzania, the Central African Republic, the Ivory Coast, Cameroon, the Democratic Republic of the Congo, and Togo.

Subspecies
 Phryneta coeca assimilis Kolbe, 1894
 Phryneta coeca coeca Chevrolat, 1857

References

Phrynetini
Beetles described in 1857